Inveruglas is a hamlet on the west shore of Loch Lomond, fairly near the north end of the loch and is within the Loch Lomond and The Trossachs National Park. It is situated on the A82 trunk road, connecting Glasgow to Inverness. It is within the historic county of Dunbartonshire, and since 1996 it has been part of the Argyll and Bute council area.

Nearby isles include Inveruglas Isle and Wallace's Isle.  Inversnaid is roughly opposite on the east shore, there is a pedestrian ferry.

The Inveruglas Water flows into the loch at the hamlet, flowing down from Loch Sloy. The name of this watercourse is a curious back-formation, since Inveruglas means "the mouth of the Douglas".  It may have acquired this name to differentiate it from the Douglas Water a few miles further south.

Inveruglas Isle lies in Inveruglas Bay, an inlet of Loch Lomond.

Loch Lomond and Cowal Way
The Loch Lomond and Cowal Way starts and finishes at Inveruglas. This  waymarked footpath terminates at Portavadie in the Cowal Peninsula, on the east shore of Loch Fyne.

Loch Sloy Hydro-Electric Scheme

The renewable hydroelectric schemes generation hall is located on the shore of Loch Lomond at Inveruglas, part of the Sloy/Awe Hydro-Electric Scheme.  Opened by Queen Elizabeth, the Queen Mother (1900-2002) in 1950.

References

External links

Loch Sloy Hydro-Electric Scheme
Loch Lomond and Cowal Way
Loch Lomond and Trossachs National Park

Hamlets in Argyll and Bute
Loch Lomond